The black-throated thistletail (Asthenes harterti) is a species of bird in the family Furnariidae.
It is endemic to Bolivia.

Its natural habitats are subtropical or tropical moist montane forest and subtropical or tropical high-altitude grassland.

The black-throated thistletail has two subspecies:
A. h. harterti (Berlepsch, 1901) - northern Bolivia
A. h. bejaranoi (Remsen, 1981) - central Bolivia

References

External links
Black-throated thistletail videos on the Internet Bird Collection

black-throated thistletail
Birds of the Bolivian Andes
Endemic birds of Bolivia
black-throated thistletail
Taxonomy articles created by Polbot